Francis George Foster (6 November 1848 – 10 December 1931) was an English first-class cricketer. He was a right-handed batsman who made one first-class appearance for Hampshire in 1876 against Derbyshire. Foster scored 12 runs in the match, leaving him with an average of 6.

Foster died at Earl Grey, Saskatchewan on 10 December 1931.

External links
Francis Foster at Cricinfo
Francis Foster at CricketArchive

1848 births
1931 deaths
People from Havant
English cricketers
Hampshire cricketers